Sean Patrick Ramos (born April 15, 2001), known professionally as Shanti Dope, is a Filipino rapper, singer  and songwriter. He is known for his songs "Nadarang", "Shantidope", "MAU", and "Amatz".

Shanti Dope started writing verses in 2013 following the footsteps of local rappers who use songwriting as a way to tell stories. Influenced by the idea of storytelling through rap, his first long verse got him into rapper Smugglaz' 2015 album Walking Distance.

Discography

EPs
 Shanti Dope (2017)
 Materyal (2017)
 Basic (2022)

Singles
 "Nadarang" (2017)
 "Shanti Dope" (featuring Gloc-9) (2017)
 "Apoy" (with Abra) (2018)
 "Norem" (with Gloc-9 featuring Abaddon and JKris) (2018)
 "Almost Love – Shanti Dope version" (with Sabrina Carpenter) (2018)
 "Crazy (International remix)"  (with MiMi, NomaD, Krayzie Bone) (2018)
 "Bata, Dahan-Dahan x Nadarang" (with IV of Spades) (2018)
 "Sa Kahapon" (with IV of Spades) (2018)
 "Namamasko Po" (with IV of Spades) (2018)
 "Amatz" (2019)
 "Imposible" (with KZ Tandingan) (2019)
 "Pati Pato" (with Chito Miranda and Gloc-9) (2019)
 "Normalan" (2020)
 "Teknik" (2020)
 "Maya" (2022)
 "Tricks" (2022)
 "City girl" (2022)

In other media
Shanti Dope's hit song, "Amatz" was featured in the Disney+ series The Falcon and the Winter Soldier (Episode 3: "Power Broker") during a scene where the Falcon and the Winter Soldier travel to Madripoor, a fictional Southeast Asian city.

Awards and nominations

See also
List of awards and nominations received by Shanti Dope
Filipino hip hop
Al James
Gloc-9
List of Filipino hip hop artists

References

Living people
Filipino rappers
Universal Records (Philippines) artists
21st-century Filipino male singers
Musicians from Quezon City
2001 births